This is a list of mayors of the City of Whittlesea, a local government area in Melbourne, Australia since 1997.

Mayors

See also
 Local government areas of Victoria

References

Whittlesea
Mayors Whittlesea
City of Whittlesea